Salad cream is a creamy, pale yellow condiment based on an emulsion of about 25–50 percent oil in water, emulsified by egg yolk and acidulated by spirit vinegar. It is somewhat similar in composition to mayonnaise and may include other ingredients such as sugar, mustard, salt, thickener, spices, flavouring and colouring. The first ready-made commercial product was introduced in the United Kingdom in 1914, where it is used as a salad dressing and a sandwich spread.

Historically, salad cream, often mentioned in Victorian sources, consisted of "hard-boiled eggs puréed with cream, mustard, salt and vinegar".

Brands
In the UK, it has been produced by companies including H. J. Heinz Company and Crosse & Blackwell. Heinz Salad Cream was the first brand developed exclusively for the UK market. When first created in the Harlesden kitchens of Heinz in 1914, it was prepared by hand. The jars were packed in straw-lined barrels with 12 dozen in each. The quota was 180 dozen jars a day, with a halfpenny a dozen bonus if the workforce could beat the target.

See also

 List of sauces
 Miracle Whip, a similar North American condiment

References

External links
"Salad Cream," from BBC h2g2 site
"Cornish Salad Cream Recipe" - The Green Chronicle; A forerunner to the modern salad cream

British condiments
Salad dressings
Sauces
Mayonnaise
Heinz brands
Products introduced in 1914